Zalisne is an urban-type settlement in the Snizhne Municipality, Horlivka Raion of Donetsk Oblast (province) in eastern Ukraine. Population:

Demographics
Native language as of the Ukrainian Census of 2001:
 Ukrainian 18.77%
 Russian 75.2%
 Belarusian 0.33%
 Armenian 0.07%
 Moldovan (Romanian) 0.04%

References

Urban-type settlements in Horlivka Raion